Ernest Gilbert Peacock (born 11 December 1924 and died 12 February 1973 in Bristol) was an English footballer who played as a half back. He made over 340 Football League appearances in the years after the Second World War.

Career
Ernie Peacock played locally for Barleyfield school and Syston in Bristol. Peacock played as a guest for Bath City during the Second World War before he signed for Notts County in the summer of 1945. Bob Hewison signed Peacock in October 1946 from Notts County for Bristol City.

Honours
with Bristol City
Football League Third Division South winner: 1954–55

References

1924 births
1973 deaths
Footballers from Bristol
English footballers
Association football defenders
English Football League players
Southern Football League players
Weymouth F.C. players
Western Football League players
Taunton Town F.C. players
Bristol City F.C. players
Taunton Town F.C. managers
Notts County F.C. players
Association football midfielders
English football managers